Adelong is a small town in the Riverina region of New South Wales, Australia, situated on the banks of the Adelong Creek.
Adelong sits on the Snowy Mountains Highway and is a part of the Snowy Valleys Council.

Etymology
Adelong's name is said to be derived from the local Aboriginal language meaning "along the way" or "plain with a river".

History
The area now known as Adelong lies on the traditional lands of the Wiradjuri people.

In 1852 during the Australian Gold Rush, gold was discovered at Upper Adelong. Records around the time indicated a yield of 198 kg of precious metals. In 1855 Adelong was declared a gold field. The Adelong township, which was first established in 1836, came alive when in 1857 William Willams discovered a gold bearing reef ore on Charcoal Hill. Alluvial mining and panning along the Adelong Creek was followed by mines being staked in the surrounding hills and water and steam powered stamper batteries were located along the creek to crush and process the hard pyritic quartz ore. These included the heritage-listed Adelong Falls Gold Workings.
 
The gold ran out in the latter part of the 19th century and the pastoral industry became the principal activity. This was mainly Merino sheep and beef cattle, and continues now. Over the last 20 years a tourist industry has developed because of the pleasant scenery and gold mining history.
During the gold rush many Chinese people worked in the mines, a lot of whom died and were buried in a special portion of the Adelong cemetery. One or two elderly Chinese and Indians still lived in Adelong in the 1950s. A community named Cornishtown existed about a mile to the west of Adelong until the 1940s.

Climate

Adelong has a climate that is characteristic of the lower South West Slopes, though wetter on account of its proximity to the dividing range. Summers are hot and dry; winters cool and rainy, with occasional snowfall. Cold rain below  and sleet are common occurrences in winter. Seasonal range is great about the maximum temperatures, and in the warmer months, diurnal range is also great.

Rainfall records began in 1883 at Adelong (Tumut St), but temperature averages not until 1907, and temperature extremes not until 1965. All records ceased in 1994.

Heritage listings 
Adelong has a number of heritage-listed sites, including:
 Adelong Falls Gold Workings
 Hillas Creek: Hillas Hut

Education
There are currently two primary schools, Adelong Public School and St. Joseph's Primary School,  servicing the town and surrounding areas.

References

Towns in the Riverina
Snowy Valleys Council
Adelong
Mining towns in New South Wales